Buzen Nichigen (豊前日源, before 1263 – 1315) was a disciple of Nichiren who converted along with the rest of the Tendai temple Jisso-ji (實相寺) to Nichiren Buddhism in 1270. Nichiren's letter Jissoji gosho (實相寺御書, 1278) is addressed to him. Later, he joined Nichiren on Mount Minobu, and founded several temples after Nichiren's death.

References

1315 deaths
Japanese Buddhist clergy
Nichiren Buddhism
Nichiren-shū Buddhist monks
Year of birth uncertain
Kamakura period Buddhist clergy